Henry Ryley B.D. (d. 1586) was a Canon of Windsor from 1560 to 1586.

Career

He was educated at Corpus Christi College, Oxford and graduated BA in 1534, MA in 1537, BD in 1544.

He was appointed:
Rector of Stratfieldsaye, Hampshire
Fellow of Eton College 1546
Fellow of Collegiate Church, Manchester 1557
Prebendary of Gillingham Major in Salisbury 1564

He was appointed to the tenth stall in St George's Chapel, Windsor Castle in 1560 and held the canonry until 1586.

Notes 

1586 deaths
Canons of Windsor
Alumni of Corpus Christi College, Oxford
Fellows of Eton College
Year of birth unknown